Cross Border Trio is an international collaborate jazz group featuring American saxophonist Jason Robinson (musician), bassist Rob Thorsen, and Mexican percussionist Paquito Villa.  Formed in 2003, the group has released an album, New Directions (2007/Circumvention), and toured extensively throughout Mexico and occasionally appeared in the United States.  Since 2008, the group has featured a rotating cast of guest members and used the names of Cross Border Trio and X Border.

Members
Jason Robinson (musician), saxophone
Rob Thorsen, bass
Paquito Villa, drums

Guest members
Rick Helzer, piano
Joshua White, piano
Anthony Smith, piano and vibraphone

Discography
Cross Border Trio, New Directions (Circumvention, 2007)

External links
Cross Border Trio official website
Cross Border Trio at MySpace

American jazz ensembles